Julius Kade (born 20 May 1999) is a German professional footballer who plays as a midfielder for 2. Bundesliga club Dynamo Dresden.

Career
On 6 August 2020, Kade signed for Dynamo Dresden on a three-year deal from Union Berlin. During his first year at Dynamo Dresden, he appeared in 30 matches, scoring 3 goals en-route to winning the 2020–21 3. Liga season as champions, gaining promotion to 2. Bundesliga. In the Summer of 2021, Union Berlin exercised a €500,000 contract transfer clause to purchase back Kade from Dresden to the Köpenick based club currently playing in Bundesliga. However, after spending the pre-season in Berlin, Kade returned to Dresden for a sum that was reported to be close to Union's original option.

Honours
Dynamo Dresden
 3. Liga: 2020–21

References

External links

 
 

Living people
1999 births
Association football midfielders
Footballers from Berlin
German footballers
Germany youth international footballers
Bundesliga players
2. Bundesliga players
3. Liga players
Regionalliga players
Hertha BSC players
1. FC Union Berlin players
Dynamo Dresden players